Pedro Báez (born January 15, 1997) is a Paraguayan professional footballer who currently plays as a forward.

Career
Báez began his professional career in the youth squads of Cerro Porteño, before debuting for the club's first team in 2016 against Club Sol de America. During that same year, he also made appearances with the Paraguay U20 side at the 2016 Toulon Tournament in France.

On July 22, 2016, Báez was signed to a six-month loan deal with Real Salt Lake of Major League Soccer.

References

External links

1997 births
Living people
Paraguayan footballers
Paraguayan expatriate footballers
Cerro Porteño players
Real Salt Lake players
Real Monarchs players
Independiente F.B.C. footballers
Major League Soccer players
USL Championship players
Paraguayan Primera División players
Liga FPD players
Association football forwards
Paraguay under-20 international footballers
Paraguayan expatriate sportspeople in the United States
Expatriate soccer players in the United States
Expatriate footballers in Costa Rica
Paraguayan expatriate sportspeople in Costa Rica